Irsayevo (İrsay) is a rural locality (a village) and the administrative centre of Irsayevsky Selsoviet, Mishkinsky District, Bashkortostan, Russia. The population was 531 as of 2010. There are 7 streets.

Geography 
Irsayevo is located 4 km north of Mishkino (the district's administrative centre) by road. Mitryayevo is the nearest rural locality.

References 

Rural localities in Mishkinsky District